Jonathan Michael Batiste (born November 11, 1986) is an American musician, singer, songwriter, composer, bandleader, and television personality. He has recorded and performed with artists in various genres of music (Stevie Wonder, Prince, Willie Nelson, Lenny Kravitz, Ed Sheeran, Roy Hargrove, and Mavis Staples), released his own recordings, and performed in more than 40 countries. Batiste, with his band Stay Human, appeared nightly as bandleader and musical director on The Late Show with Stephen Colbert from 2015 to 2022.

Batiste also serves as the music director of The Atlantic and the Creative Director of the National Jazz Museum in Harlem. In 2020, he co-composed the score for the Pixar animated film Soul, for which he received an Academy Award, a Golden Globe Award, a Grammy Award and a BAFTA Film Award (all shared with Trent Reznor and Atticus Ross). As of 2022, Batiste has garnered 5 Grammy Awards from 14 nominations, including an Album of the Year win for his album We Are.

Early life and education
Jon Batiste was born in Metairie, Louisiana, to a Catholic family. He grew up in Kenner, Louisiana. Batiste is a member of a New Orleans musical dynasty, the Batiste family, that includes Lionel Batiste of the Treme Brass Band, Milton Batiste of the Olympia Brass Band, and Russell Batiste Jr. At the age of 8, he played percussion and drums with his family's band, the Batiste Brothers Band. At the age of 11, he switched to piano at his mother's suggestion. Batiste developed his piano skills by taking classical music lessons and transcribing songs from video games such as Street Fighter Alpha, Final Fantasy VII and Sonic the Hedgehog.

At 17, Batiste released his debut album Times in New Orleans. He attended St. Augustine High School and New Orleans Center for Creative Arts with Trombone Shorty in New Orleans and graduated in 2004. He then went on to attend the Juilliard School, receiving a Bachelor of Music in 2008 and a Master of Music in 2011, both in jazz studies. While at Juilliard, he released his second album, Live in New York: At the Rubin Museum of Art. By the end of 2006, Batiste had been a featured performer in South Africa, London, Lisbon, Spain, Paris and the United States.

Career

In 2007, Batiste made his debut at the Concertgebouw in Amsterdam at the age of 20, producing and performing his own show. He conducted music clinics, classes and workshops throughout the Netherlands in inner-city schools and underprivileged neighborhoods. He was invited to Carnegie Hall to produce and perform in his own show with six young musicians from the Netherlands. The performance concluded with a finale he composed for choir, jazz combo and orchestral instruments. In the following years, Batiste released a number of music projects including Social Music (2013), which spent over a month at the top of the Billboard and iTunes jazz charts; The Late Show EP (2016) with Stay Human; and a holiday album Christmas with Jon Batiste (2016). In 2017, he released the singles "Ohio" with Leon Bridges and Gary Clark Jr. as well as "Battle Hymn of the Republic" for The Atlantic. Batiste's cover of "St. James Infirmary Blues" was nominated for a Grammy in 2019, in the category of Best American Roots Performance. Batiste's debut solo album Hollywood Africans was released by Verve Records in September 2018. "Don't Stop" served as the lead single. Leading up to the album release, he completed a Summer Festival tour across the U.S. with The Dap-Kings.

Batiste's notable career performances include a tribute to Chuck Berry and Fats Domino during the 60th annual Grammy Awards (performing alongside Gary Clark Jr.); the Kennedy Center Honors' tribute to Carmen De Lavallade; the Concert for Peace and Justice in Montgomery, Alabama; the National Anthem at the 2017 NBA All Star Game; and Opening Night of the 2017 US Open. He has curated the Global Citizen Advocacy Concert with Tom Morello and the Louis Armstrong Wonderful World Festival in Queens, N.Y.

Batiste was cast in the HBO television series Treme, appearing as himself in seasons 2, 3 and 4. He was also cast as T.K. Hazelton in director Spike Lee's film Red Hook Summer and composed and performed the Hammond B-3 organ music that was a part of the film score. Other film scores composed by Batiste include the television documentary Duke 91 & 92: Back to Back and the short film Melody of Choice. He also appears in the films Da Sweet Blood of Jesus by Spike Lee and Thrive by Paul Szynol.

Stay Human

In 2005, Batiste began performing regularly in New York with his Juilliard peers, bassist Phil Kuehn and drummer Joe Saylor. He later added Eddie Barbash on alto saxophone and Ibanda Ruhumbika on tuba. Batiste named the band Stay Human, which draws its moniker from the belief that human interaction during a live musical performance can uplift humanity in the midst of the "plug in, tune out" nature of modern society. The band leads impromptu street performances, which Batiste calls "love riots". Notable artists were often seen accompanying Batiste, including Wynton Marsalis.

In 2011, Stay Human released the album MY N.Y., which was recorded in its entirety on New York City Subway trains, an idea that came to Batiste after questioning how to connect with people.

On April 22, 2017, the band played for the March for Science rally at the Washington Monument in Washington, D.C.

In 2014, Batiste and Stay Human appeared on The Colbert Report to perform the group's single "Express Yourself", written and produced with Austin Bis.

The Late Show with Stephen Colbert
On June 4, 2015, it was announced that Jon Batiste and Stay Human would serve as house band on The Late Show with Stephen Colbert. The show premiered on CBS on September 8, 2015. On the show, Batiste and Stay Human have performed alongside Billy Joel, Will Smith, Wynton Marsalis, John Legend, Grace VanderWaal, and Nas.

On the August 11, 2022, episode, Colbert announced that Batiste had decided he would not be returning to The Late Show with Stephen Colbert, in order to "pursue personal and professional interests".

Juneteenth celebration

In June 2020, Batiste took part in the Juneteenth celebration in Brooklyn, New York with a day of protests, marches, rallies, and vigils to "celebrate, show solidarity, and fight for equal rights and treatment of Black people". Performing on the steps of the Brooklyn Public Library, Batiste was joined by Matt Whitaker in a performance presented in partnership with Sing For Hope.

The 2020 Juneteenth took place during the protests following the murder of George Floyd, as well as the COVID-19 pandemic, seen by some as connected to an increase in an awareness of racial injustice. When questioned as to the differences he sees in the present movement for change, and its connection to music, Batiste responded by saying: "...music has always been something that has had all of the different purposes of our life and our community and our healing and our unspoken painand the transmission of messages and the raising awareness of a condition of a people. [...] What's different now is that it's much more widespread in the support of changing the systemic oppression that's been going on for 400 years." He believes, "Now, it's more important than ever for us to be reintroduced to what our ancestors used music for, because it's been forgotten. [...] The world at large sees music as entertainment. It's never been that, at its root. It is that in one element of it, but the entire spectrum of music is far, far deeper and wide-ranging."

Soul and We Are
Batiste composed music for the 2020 film Soul, collaborating with Trent Reznor and Atticus Ross. The trio went on to win the Academy Award for Best Original Score and a Golden Globe Award for Best Original Score among many other wins and nominations.

On March 19, 2021, Batiste released We Are, his fifth solo studio album. Speaking to Atwood Magazine, he described it as "a culmination of my life to this point" and "the most representative of where I'm at as a creative, and as an artist".

In July 2021, Batiste released a live EP, Live at Electric Lady, performed in one day at Electric Lady Studios. The album was released exclusively to Spotify.

In October 2021 he made a surprise performance at night singing "Like a Prayer" in the streets of Harlem along with Madonna promoting the release of her concert film Madame X.

At the 64th Grammy Awards, Batiste earned 11 nominations: eight for We Are, and three for Soul. Of the 11 nominations, Batiste won five awards including Album of the Year, becoming the first Black artist to win that award since 2008, when Herbie Hancock won for his album River: The Joni Letters.

Personal life
Batiste is married to journalist, author, and cancer survivor Suleika Jaouad. The two met as teenagers at band camp. On April 3, 2022, the couple revealed in an interview on CBS News Sunday Morning that they had been married in a private ceremony at home in February 2022.

Influences and music style 
Batiste cites among the artists who have most influenced his artistic and musical choices Mahalia Jackson, James Brown, Louis Armstrong, Bruce Springsteen, Stevie Wonder, John Coltrane, Nina Simone, Miles Davis and Django Reinhardt. Interviewed by Forbes, Batiste explained the significance of jazz music:

Activism and philanthropy 
Batiste was born into a family active in the struggle against racial segregation in the United States; his grandfather David Gauthier was president of the Louisiana Postal Workers Union, involved in the 1968 labor strike sponsored by the Memphis, Tennessee, Department of Public Works for higher wages and safer working conditions. The protest led to the presence of Martin Luther King Jr., where he delivered his "I've Been to the Mountaintop" speech, the day before his assassination.

The singer is a supporter of civil rights, the fight against racism, participating publicly in numerous demonstrations, including the marches promoted by the Black Lives Matter movement. Following the murder of George Floyd in June 2020, Batiste organized peaceful protests in New York City against police brutality in the United States.

Through the single "We Are", he supports the Equal Justice Initiative of attorney and activist Bryan Stevenson. Batiste is also among the sponsors of several initiatives, including Innocence Project, the NAACP Legal Defense and Educational Fund, and The Legacy Museum.

Discography

Studio albums

Collaborative albums

Soundtrack albums

Live albums

Extended plays

Singles

As lead artist

As featured artist

Awards and honors

Batiste has received several accolades, including being placed in the 2016 Forbes 30 Under 30 music list, and being named Grand Marshal of Endymion Parade in New Orleans in 2018.

He has been awarded the American Jazz Museum Lifetime Achievement Award, the Harry Chapin ASCAP Humanitarian Award and the Movado Future Legend Award. In May 2017, Batiste received an honorary degree from Salve Regina University for his musical achievements and contributions to Newport's 2014 International Jazz Day. In 2018, he was nominated for a Grammy Award for Best American Roots Performance for "Saint James Infirmary Blues". In 2020, he received two Grammy nominations: his album Chronology of a Dream: Live at the Village Vanguard was nominated for Best Contemporary Instrumental Album, and Meditations (with Cory Wong) was nominated for Best New Age Album.

In 2020 Batiste, along with Nine Inch Nails band members Trent Reznor and Atticus Ross, composed the score for the Disney and Pixar animated film Soul. The three went on to win the Golden Globe, the Critics' Choice Award, the BAFTA Award, and the Academy Award for Best Original Score. Batiste's Oscar win made him only the second black composer to win an award in the category (after Herbie Hancock in 1987). In 2021, Batiste received 11 nominations and became the most nominated artist at the 64th Annual Grammy Awards.

In 2022, Batiste won a Grammy Award for Album of the Year. He was named in Time magazine's 2022 "Top 100 Most Influential People", in the Icons category. Batiste was featured on the 2022 New Orleans Jazz & Heritage Festival's commemorative poster.

Notes

References

Further reading

External links

"Jon Batiste: Staying Human", interview by Bob Kenselaar, All About Jazz, January 2013, 
The Batiste Family

1986 births
20th-century African-American musicians
20th-century American musicians
20th-century American singers
20th-century jazz composers
21st-century African-American musicians
21st-century American musicians
21st-century jazz composers
African-American Catholics
African-American jazz composers
African-American jazz pianists
African-American male singers
American jazz composers
American jazz pianists
American male jazz composers
American male pianists
Animated film score composers
Annie Award winners
Articles containing video clips
Best Original Music BAFTA Award winners
Best Original Music Score Academy Award winners
Golden Globe Award-winning musicians
Grammy Award winners
Jazz musicians from New Orleans
Juilliard School alumni
Living people
Melodica players
People from Kenner, Louisiana
Singers from Louisiana
St. Augustine High School (New Orleans) alumni
The Late Show Band members
The Late Show with Stephen Colbert
African-American film score composers